Nina Marakina (born 18 February 1947) is a Ukrainian athlete. She competed in the women's javelin throw at the 1972 Summer Olympics.

References

1947 births
Living people
Athletes (track and field) at the 1972 Summer Olympics
Ukrainian female javelin throwers
Olympic athletes of the Soviet Union
Sportspeople from Kharkiv
Soviet female javelin throwers